Egone is a genus of moths of the family Erebidae first described by Francis Walker in 1863.

Species
 Egone atrisquamata Hampson, 1926
 Egone bipunctalis Walker, 1863

References

External links

Calpinae
Moth genera